Dudhnath Tiwari (or Tewari also spelled Doodnath Tewarry in British Indian records) (fl. 1857–1866) was an Indian convict (number 276) from the Sepoy mutiny who was sent to the penal settlement in the Andamans and became famous for escaping and living with the Andamanese tribes for about a year. Accounts of life among the tribals, though coloured by his own prejudices and by possible embellishments, became famous in his time. During the time that he spent among the tribes, he came to learn of a tribal uprising being planned against the British at the penal settlement at which point he chose to return to the penal settlement and reveal the plans. The British penal settlement officers then prepared themselves for what was known as the Battle of Aberdeen in which the tribals were defeated. For his actions Tiwari was pardoned.

Tiwari was a sepoy of the 14th regiment of native infantry and had been sentenced for mutiny and desertion during the 1857 rebellion. He was sent to the penal settlement at Port Blair on the 8th of April 1858 but he, along with 90 others, escaped from the Ross Island Penal Colony on the 23rd. The escapees made rafts with felled trees, tied with tent ropes. A fellow prisoner Aga had claimed that the shore opposite was 10 days of walking from the capital of Burma. All earlier prisoners who had attempted an escape had either returned to the penal settlement after being lost in the jungle for days without food or had been killed by the tribals. Tiwari was the sole survivor of this escape attempt and he submitted a report of his travels to Dr J.P. Walker, the superintendent. In his statements which were reprinted widely he recounted his escape and life among the tribals. He claimed that the escape party had met up with another bunch of escapees from Phoenix Bay and Chatham Island and together, nearly 130 convicts, walked through the jungle for eight days without food. They then found some fruits to eat and obtained water from some freshwater springs and by cutting certain creeping canes. Twelve members were left to die of hunger and thirst. They never came across any natives, but came across abandoned dwellings. On the fourteenth day they were surrounded at noon by a party of 100 aborigines armed with bows and arrows. Attempts to signal surrender failed and a large number of convicts were killed. Tiwari escaped with arrow wounds on the eyebrow, elbow, and shoulder along with Shoo Dull and another convict (identified only as belonging to the Kurmi caste) and reached a tidal creek and spent the night there. The next day they were detected by another party of tribals who shot at them, killing the two and leaving Tiwari wounded and feigning dead. He was dragged out and shot at again, he feigned dead and then attempted to remove the arrows. The tribals then took him in their boat and applied soil to his wounds. They then took him to another island called Turmooglee. His wounds healed and he adopted the tribal customs, living naked with a shaved head. The tribals looked upon him with suspicion and never let him use a bow and arrow. They never made him work and after about four months, Pooteah, an elder assigned his daughter Leepa, of twenty, and another girl of sixteen called Jigah, daughter of Heera, as wives. Tiwari described his views on the lives of the tribes. He claimed that the aboriginals had no idea of a God and he had five wives in all with very little ceremony. Babies were reared and suckled by any nursing mothers in the tribe. After spending a year and 24 days, he returned to the convict settlement to warn them of the impending attack. F.J. Mouat considered Tewari's account as exaggerated and compared him with Munchausen. Edward Horace Man also considered some of Tiwari's accounts to have been concocted.

Maurice Vidal Portman identified the tribe that Tiwari lived with as the Aka-Bea-da. Tiwari was subsequently pardoned and released. The Government order read:

In 1866, Tiwari was taken to Port Blair by Jeremiah Homfray who headed the  Andaman Home which had been founded by Rev. Henry Fisher Corbyn to "civilize" the Andamanese. Several inmates at the Andaman Home were able to recognize Tiwari. The women abused and berated Tiwari for having abandoned his pregnant wife Leepa.

References

External links
Sharma, Rajni (2014). The statement of mutiny prisoner Doodnath Tewarry: An ethnographic study. MA Dissertation. NIT, Rourkela.

Andaman and Nicobar Islands
Indian prisoners sentenced to life imprisonment
19th-century Indian people